Ulaangom Airport  is a public airport located 13 km northwest of Ulaangom, a city in the Uvs Province of Mongolia. It handled 14,669 passengers in 2001.  The construction of the new airport with paved runway started in February 2007. It was completed in 2009.

Airlines and destinations

See also 

 List of airports in Mongolia

References

External links 
 Ulaangom Airport

Airports in Mongolia